of the ship is a rank used by the Russian Navy and a number of former communist state. The rank is the most senior rank in the non-commissioned officer's career group. It is usually equivalent to Warrant officer or Senior chief petty officer in English speaking navies.

Russia

The rank was introduced in the Soviet Navy on 18 November 1971.

In the navy of the Russian Federation there are four ranks in the petty officer´s career group, which means:

 Rank insignia Glavny starshina of the ship

Insignia

See also
Ranks and rank insignia of the Soviet Army 1955–1991,
Ranks and rank insignia of the Russian Federation´s armed forces 1994–2010
Army ranks and insignia of the Russian Federation

References

Military ranks of Russia
Military ranks of the Soviet Union